Bokeh Game Studio Inc. is a video game developer based in Tokyo, Japan. It was founded by Keiichiro Toyama following his departure from Sony Interactive Entertainment. They announced their first title, Slitterhead, at The Game Awards 2021.

History 
Prior to the imminent disbandment of Japan Studio, Keiichiro Toyama met with colleagues Sato Kazunobu and Junya Okura, whom he had worked with on the Silent Hill series, Siren series (and the latter on the Gravity Rush series) to discuss the possibility of forming their own independent studio. After months of negotiations with various parties, they registered the company in August 2020, and made their announcement in December 2020. Toyama would be CEO/Creator, while Okura would be CTO/Game Director and Sato as COO/Producer.

In February 2020, Toyama revealed on Bokeh Game Studio's YouTube Channel that their first project is an action-adventure game with horror elements, marking his return to the genre after more than a decade. Producer Sato also revealed that the gameplay would force players to make "sacrifices", some of them being "quite nasty". On December 9th 2021, at The Game Awards 2021, they revealed the first teaser trailer for Slitterhead.

References 

2020 establishments in Japan
Video game companies of Japan
Video game development companies
Video game companies established in 2020
Software companies based in Tokyo